= Fuzhou Oyster Cake =

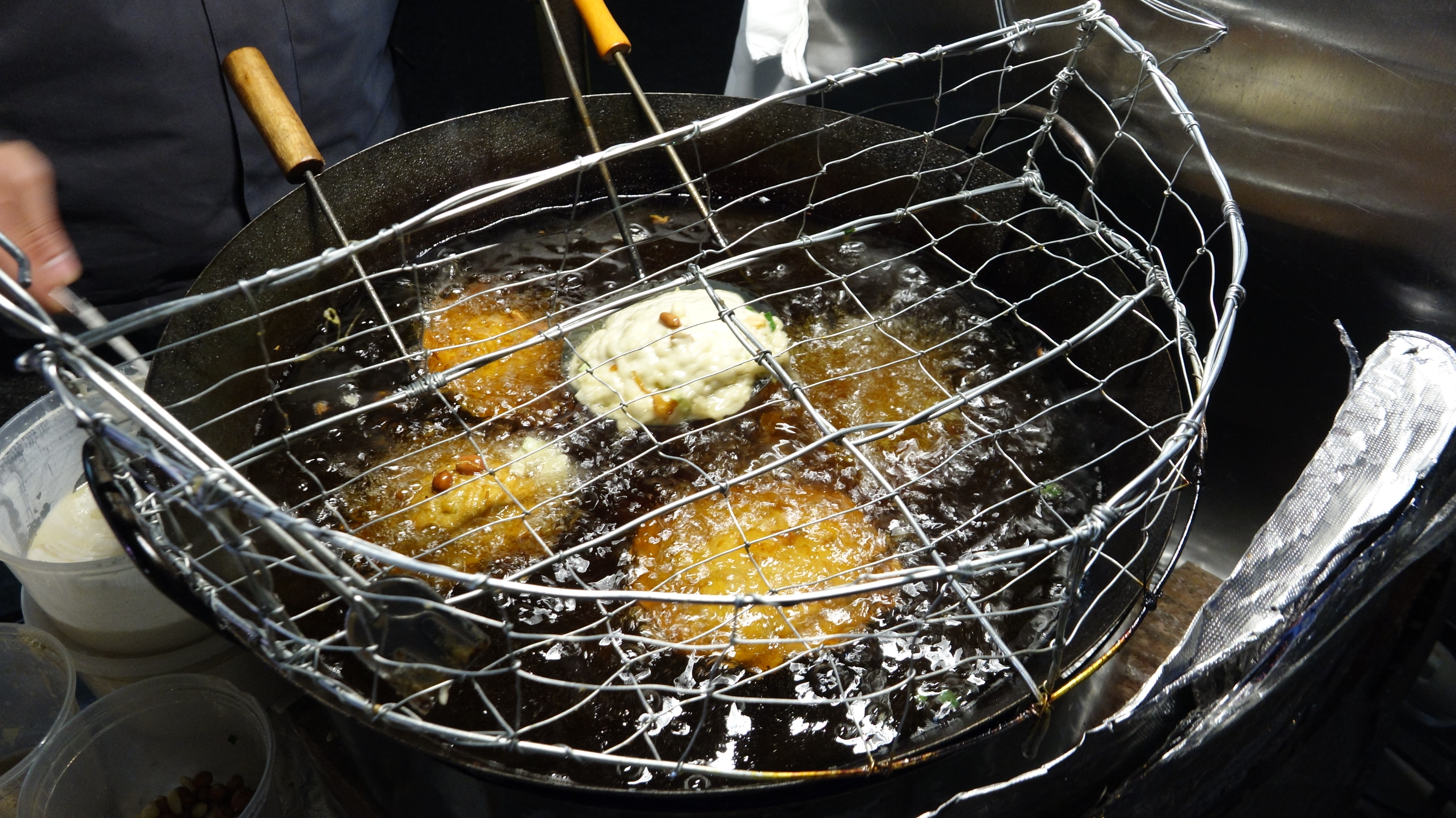
Fuzhou Style Oyster Cake being prepared in Flushing NY

Fuzhou Oyster Cake (炸蚝饼) is a food prepared in various parts of Asia, originated in Fuzhou, consisting of various mixes of meat, oysters, and vegetables. Some restaurants serving the dish have qualified for Michelin stars, the reviews of which mention the dish. They were once common in Singapore but are now more difficult to locate.

The dough is made of ground up soybeans and rice mixed together. The dough is then spread on a ladle; various ingredients like pork, oyster, and vegetables are placed on top of it, and then another layer of dough is brushed on top. The finished cake is then fried until done.
